Gatsby may refer to:

 The Great Gatsby, a 1925 novel by F. Scott Fitzgerald
 The Great Gatsby (disambiguation), an index of film adaptations of the novel
 Jay Gatsby, the novel's central character

Other uses
 Gatsby cap, a hat with a stiff front brim
 Gatsby (JavaScript framework), a static site generator based on React
 Gatsby (sandwich), a South African food
 GATSBY, a Japanese cosmetic brand
 Gatsby Charitable Foundation, a grant-making trust in London
 Gatsbys American Dream,  a progressive rock band from Seattle, Washington

See also
Gadsby (disambiguation)